The following is the qualification summary for boxing competitions at the 2008 Summer Olympics.

Qualification summary

Qualification timeline

Light Flyweight (-48kg)

Flyweight (-51kg)

Bantamweight (-54kg)

Featherweight (-57kg)

Lightweight (-60kg)

Light Welterweight (-64kg)

Welterweight (-69kg)

Middleweight (-75kg)

Light Heavyweight (-81kg)

Heavyweight (-91kg)

Super Heavyweight (+91kg)

References
Qualified Boxers by Name, Country & Weight Category
AIBA Guidelines of the Olympic Qualifying Tournament after the World Boxing

Qualification for the 2008 Summer Olympics